Nearer My God to Thee is a 1917 British silent drama film directed by Cecil M. Hepworth and starring Henry Edwards, Alma Taylor and A.V. Bramble. It is not known whether the film currently survives.

Plot
As described in a film magazine, a hunchback is employed as an organist at an Episcopal church and at other times works as a school teacher. In the latter work he is associated with a young woman, with whom he is very infatuated. A London man of sporting tendencies quickly wins over the woman with his polished manners and ardent courtship and he marries her. After the wedding the husband goes back to the ways of his bachelorhood, frequenting the public places and spending his time in one prolonged debauch. The bride tends a store from which they derive their livelihood. The husband mistreats and abuses her. In the end, circumstances straighten themselves out with her marrying the hunchback, whose love never faltered.

Cast
 Henry Edwards as John Drayton  
 Alma Taylor as Joan  
 A.V. Bramble as Jim Boden  
 Teddy Taylor as Alec  
 Beryl Rhodes as Littlest Girl 
 John MacAndrews

References

Bibliography
Palmer, Scott. British Film Actors' Credits, 1895-1987. McFarland, 1988.

External links

1917 films
1917 drama films
British drama films
British silent feature films
1910s English-language films
Films directed by Cecil Hepworth
Hepworth Pictures films
British black-and-white films
1910s British films
Silent drama films